The Ambassador from New Zealand to Chile is New Zealand's foremost diplomatic representative in the Republic of Chile, and in charge of New Zealand's diplomatic mission in Chile.

The embassy is located in Santiago, Chile's capital city.  New Zealand has maintained a resident ambassador in Chile since 1973.  The Ambassador to Chile is concurrently accredited to Colombia and Peru.

List of heads of mission

Ambassadors to Chile
 John G. McArthur (1973–1975)
 Ken Cunningham (1975–1976)

Chargés d'Affaires in Chile
 David Holborow (1976–1978)

Ambassadors to Chile
 David Holborow (1978–1981)
 Ian Landon-Lane (1981–1985)
 Barry Brooks (1985–1988)
 Paul Tipping (1988–1992)
 Francis Ormond Wilson (1992–1996)
 David McGee (1996–2000)
 Richard Mann (2000–2005)
 Nigel Fyfe (2005 - 2009 )
 Rosemary Paterson (2009-2012?)
 John Capper (August 2012- March 2015)
 Jacqui Caine (March 2015 – 2018)
 Linda Te Puni  (December 2018 – present)

See also
 Chile–New Zealand relations

References

 .  New Zealand Ministry of Foreign Affairs and Trade.  Retrieved on 2012-05-11.

 
Chile, Ambassadors from New Zealand to
New Zealand